Stephen J. Smith (born August 31, 1951) is an American businessman, accountant, and Democratic politician, who was previously elected to the Wisconsin State Assembly.

Background 
Smith graduated from the University of Wisconsin–Superior and is a business owner and accountant. His mother, Patricia Spafford Smith, who died in 2002, was also a business owner and accountant, and served in the Assembly as a Democrat from 1979 to 1983.

Public office 
Smith served on the Barron County, Wisconsin Board of Supervisors. On November 6, 2012, he was elected to the Wisconsin State Assembly's 75th district (the same district his mother had represented) as a Democrat, defeating Republican incumbent Roger Rivard, who had become controversial after quoting his father as telling him as a teenager that "some girls rape easy" as a warning that what he may think is consensual teenage sex can become rape after the fact. On November 4, 2014, Romaine Quinn defeated Smith for the Wisconsin Assembly seat.

Notes

American accountants
Businesspeople from Wisconsin
County supervisors in Wisconsin
Living people
Democratic Party members of the Wisconsin State Assembly
People from Barron County, Wisconsin
Politicians from Minneapolis
University of Wisconsin–Superior alumni
University of Wisconsin–Superior alumni
1951 births
People from Shell Lake, Wisconsin